Gerdakaneh (also Romanized as Gerdakāneh) is a village in Fash Rural District, in the Central District of Kangavar County, Kermanshah Province, Iran. At the 2006 census, its population was 195, in 39 families.

References 

Populated places in Kangavar County